Ganim was an Israeli settlement in the northern West Bank under the administrative local government of the Shomron Regional Council. Israeli settlements in the occupied West Bank, including East Jerusalem, are illegal under international law.

History
The settlement was founded in 1983 by members of Betar. Its name was derived from the biblical name of Jenin, the nearby city, which was originally called Ein Ganim. Ein Ganim belonged to the area under the control of the Tribe of Issachar. For this reason, Ein-Ganim was also the name given to an Israeli community which today forms part of the Israeli city of Petah Tikva.

Unilateral disengagement
The residents of Ganim were evacuated from their homes and the synagogue was dismantled by the Israeli army as part of Israel's disengagement in 2005.

See also
Homesh
Kadim
Sa-Nur

References

External links
Disengagement Plan of Prime Minister Ariel Sharon - Revised

Villages depopulated during the Arab–Israeli conflict
Former Israeli settlements in the West Bank
Israeli disengagement from Gaza
Shomron Regional Council
Populated places established in 1983
Forced migration
1983 establishments in the Palestinian territories